EuroPride is a pan-European international event dedicated to LGBT pride, hosted by a different European city each year. The host city is usually one with an established pride event or a significant LGBT community.

For up to a month, numerous sporting, artistic and human rights events are staged throughout the host city. EuroPride usually culminates during a weekend with a traditional Mardi Gras-style pride parade, live music, human rights conference, special club nights, and an AIDS memorial vigil.

History 

EuroPride was inaugurated in London in 1992, attended by estimated crowds of over 100,000. The following year, Berlin hosted the festivities.  When Amsterdam hosted EuroPride in 1994, it turned into a financial disaster, leaving debts of approximately 450,000 euros. In 1996, EuroPride moved to Copenhagen, where it enjoyed strong support from city leaders.  The organisers were successful on all fronts but not able to achieve a financial surplus.

Paris hosted EuroPride in 1997.  The festival had numerous commercial sponsors and was widely hailed as a success.  During the parade, over 300,000 people marched to the Bastille.  Stockholm was the host city in 1998.  London was to host EuroPride again in 1999, but the event was canceled when the organisers went bankrupt.
In 2000, WorldPride took place for the first time and, as has happened each time since, when WorldPride is in Europe, no separate EuroPride takes place.  The event took place in Rome and was well-attended by LGBT people from all over the world.  After initially supporting the event, city leaders pulled their support just days before due to pressure exerted by the Vatican, which was organising its Great Jubilee.

Vienna hosted the 2001 EuroPride, drawing large crowds from Central Europe.  In 2002, Köln (Cologne), Germany, held the then-biggest ever EuroPride; officials estimated crowds to number well over one million.  EuroPride was hosted by Manchester in 2003, and Hamburg in 2004.  Oslo hosted it in 2005, with Ian McKellen as the guest of honour.

London hosted the event in 2006, organising a two-week festival culminating in a parade on the final day (1 July) in which marchers were invited to walk down Oxford Street, one of the city's busiest shopping streets, the first time they had been legally allowed to do so. The parade was attended by Mayor of London Ken Livingstone, Conservative MP Alan Duncan, human rights campaigner Peter Tatchell, and the first transgender MEP, Italian Vladimir Luxuria.

Following the parade, events were held in three of the capital's squares: a rally in Trafalgar Square addressed by Ian McKellen, and entertainment in Leicester and Soho Squares. EuroPride 2006 marked the first time that London's main pride rally and entertainment areas were staged within the city itself, rather than in open parks.

In 2007, Madrid hosted EuroPride, which took place in Chueca, the capital's gay village, during the last week in June. Madrid was chosen because of the gay marriage and gender identity laws Spain had passed during the previous two years. More than 1.2 million people attended the final parade as it passed through the downtown streets of Alcalá, and Gran Vía, ending up at Plaza de España. For the first time, Madrid City Hall contributed financing to the MADO (Madrid Orgullo) organisation. In addition, a private event, the Infinitamentegay Party, took place in Casa de Campo Park.

In 2008, the Stockholm Pride organization organised EuroPride for a second time, held from 25 June to 3 August in Stockholm, a decade after hosting EuroPride 1998.

Zurich hosted EuroPride in 2009 with a month-long roster of events from 2 May to 7 June, culminating in a parade through downtown Zurich on 6 June.

The 2010 event was held in Warsaw, Poland. Organisers prepared multifaceted events between July 9 to 18. The Parade took place on July 17. It marked the first time this pan-European LGBT celebration took place in a former communist country. The Warsaw EuroPride formulated, as its main theme, a demand for legalisation of 
same sex civil partnerships.

In 2011, EuroPride returned to Rome. Hosted by Claudia Gerini, the parade closed with a performance and a speech by Lady Gaga at the Circus Maximus. That year one million people took part.

The 2013 EuroPride was in Marseille, France from July 10–20, focusing on gay marriage in France and celebrated the biggest gay wedding in Europe 

The 2016 EuroPride returned to Amsterdam.  UK singer/songwriter Tara McDonald sang her single "I Need A Miracle" which was chosen as the EuroPride anthem and was remixed by Gregor Salto.

There was no EuroPride in 2017 as WorldPride took place in Madrid.

In June 2019, President of Austria Alexander Van der Bellen became the first head of state to address a EuroPride parade.

WorldPride 

The European Pride Organisers Association, which licences EuroPride and owns the trademark, has decided that a WorldPride event held in Europe also automatically carries the title of EuroPride.

The first WorldPride was held in Rome in 2000 (see above). The second WorldPride was held in Jerusalem in 2005–2006.

London, also hosting the 2012 Summer Olympics, beat out competing candidate, Stockholm, in the fall of 2008 to hold WorldPride 2012, which was held from 23 June to 8 July.

WorldPride 2017 was held in Madrid, and WorldPride 2021 was held in Copenhagen, Denmark.

Madrid success 

Madrid's EuroPride 2007 was the most well-attended event at the time, with an estimated 2.5 million visitors. This huge attendance was not only a success for Madrid, but for the whole LGBT Spanish community, due to the celebration of the change of terms in the laws related to gay marriage and adoptions.

Madrid was one of the first Spanish cities celebrating the legalization of gay marriage, with the support of all political parties, even the conservatives in the Government, headed by the ex-mayor of the city, Alberto Ruíz Gallardón from Partido Popular.

Due to these and other advances in same-sex freedom and social progress, Madrid was chosen in 2012 to host WorldPride 2017.

Host cities

European Pride Organisers Association 

The European Pride Organisers Association (often shortened to EPOA or EuroPride) owns the EuroPride trademark and licenses its use to one Pride organisation each year.

Pride organisers from across Europe discussed the creation of a European network at conferences of InterPride and the International Lesbian & Gay Association (ILGA) in the early 1990s, and the first formal meeting of EPOA was convened in Copenhagen in 1995.

EPOA is a small organisation with eight elected board members, all of whom serve with Pride organisations in Europe. It has no paid staff, and has its headquarters in Brussels, Belgium. The board meets several times each year, often holding a meeting in a city holding its Pride event that weekend.

Any Pride organisation can become a member of EPOA upon payment of a membership fee. This gives the organisation voting rights at the Annual General Meeting, including on votes on future EuroPride bids. Membership to EPOA automatically makes a Pride a member of InterPride, its international equivalent. EPOA has more than 130 members across Europe.

The current president of EPOA is Latvian human rights activist, Kristine Garina.

See also 
 List of LGBT events
 EuroGames
 List of largest LGBT events
 LGBT rights in Europe

Footnotes

References

External links

 European Pride Organisers Association

Pride parades in Europe
Recurring events established in 1992
1992 establishments in Europe